The Fourteenth Wisconsin Legislature convened from January 9, 1861, to April 17, 1861, in regular session.  The legislature re-convened in special session from May 15, 1861, to May 27, 1861, at the request of Wisconsin Governor Alexander Randall, to approve funding for a brigade of volunteers for the American Civil War.

Senators representing odd-numbered districts were newly elected for this session and were serving the first year of a two-year term. Assembly members were elected to a one-year term. Assembly members and even-numbered senators were elected in the general election of November 6, 1860. Senators representing even-numbered districts were serving the second year of their two-year term, having been elected in the general election held on November 8, 1859.

Major events
 January 1861: Timothy O. Howe elected United States Senator by the Wisconsin Legislature in Joint Session.
 March 4, 1861: Inauguration of Abraham Lincoln as the 16th President of the United States.
 April 12, 1861: South Carolina militia began bombarding Fort Sumpter in Charleston Harbor.
 April 15, 1861: U.S. President Abraham Lincoln issued a proclamation requesting the states provide 75,000 volunteers for service in the American Civil War.
 April 16, 1861: 1st Wisconsin Volunteer Infantry Regiment raised in Milwaukee.
 May 9, 1861: Wisconsin Governor Alexander Randall called for a special session of the Wisconsin Legislature.
 July 21, 1861: First Battle of Bull Run took place in Prince William County, Virginia, one regiment of Wisconsin volunteers participated in the battle.
 November 8, 1861: Louis P. Harvey elected Governor of Wisconsin.

Major legislation

First session
 January 21, 1861: Joint Resolution, co-operating with friends of the Union throughout the United States, 1861 Joint Resolution 1
 April 11, 1861: Act to apportion the State into Senate and Assembly Districts. 1861 Act 216
 April 13, 1861: Act to provide for apportioning the State into Congressional Districts, 1861 Act 238
 April 13, 1861: Act to provide for the defence of the State, and to aid in enforcing the laws and maintaining the authority of the Federal Government, 1861 Act 239
 April 17, 1861: Act to declare the rights and privileges of such persons as may enroll themselves into the service of the country. 1861 Act 309

Special session
 May 21, 1861: Joint Resolution, authorizing the Governor to be absent from the State during the present war, 1861 Special Session Joint Resolution 1
 May 25, 1861: Joint Resolution, recommending to the War Department the formation of a Brigade, and the appointment of Hon. Rufus King to its command, 1861 Special Session Joint Resolution 2
 May 25, 1861: Joint Resolution, in regard to the assassination of Col. Ellsworth, 1861 Special Session Joint Resolution 3
 May 25, 1861: Act to provide for the assistance of volunteers in the service of the United States Government, 1861 Special Session Act 2
 May 25, 1861: Act to provide a military force for immediate service to aid in protecting and defending the Constitution and the Union, 1861 Special Session Act 4
 May 25, 1861: Act to prevent rendering aid to Rebels, 1861 Special Session Act 5
 May 25, 1861: Act to provide for the purchasing of Arms and Equipments for the use of the State, 1861 Special Session Act 6
 May 27, 1861: Act to provide for the payment of discharged Volunteers, 1861 Special Session Act 9
 May 27, 1861: Act to provide for borrowing money to repel invasion, suppress insurrection, and defend the State in time of war, 1861 Special Session Act 13

Party summary

Senate summary

Assembly summary

Sessions
 1st Regular session: January 9, 1861 – April 17, 1861
 Special session: May 15, 1861 – May 27, 1861

Leaders

Senate leadership
 President of the Senate: Butler G. Noble, Lieutenant Governor
 President pro tempore: Alden I. Bennett

Assembly leadership
 Speaker of the Assembly: Amasa Cobb

Members

Members of the Senate
Members of the Wisconsin Senate for the Fourteenth Wisconsin Legislature:

Members of the Assembly
Members of the Assembly for the Fourteenth Wisconsin Legislature:

Employees

Senate employees
 Chief Clerk: John H. Warren
 Assistant Clerk: Stephen Steele Barlow
 Engrossing Clerk: Willard Merrill
 Enrolling Clerk: Edward Colman
 Transcribing Clerk: F. H. Megdeburg
 Sergeant-at-Arms: J. A. Hadley
 Assistant Sergeant-at-Arms: David M. McBride
 Postmaster: James Moore
 Assistant Postmaster: A. B. Finch
 Doorkeeper: Phillip Carey
 Assistant Doorkeeper: Henry Case
 Fireman: George Wittle
 Messengers:
 Walter C. Wyman
 Albert F. Dexter
 Patrick Lanner

Assembly employees
 Chief Clerk: L. H. D. Crane
 Assistant Clerk: John S. Dean
 Bookkeeper: Ephraim W. Young
 Engrossing Clerk: Joseph C. Pickard
 Enrolling Clerk: Nathaniel F. Lund
 Transcribing Clerk: Harvey Briggs
 Sergeant-at-Arms: Craig B. Beese
 Assistant Sergeant-at-Arms: Asher Armstrong
 Assistant Sergeant-at-Arms: Ebenezer Sprague
 Postmaster: Hiram Beckworth
 Assistant Postmaster: John N. Stone
 Doorkeeper: Joel Barber
 Assistant Doorkeeper: Joshua W. Tolford
 Firemen:
 William C. Lasure
 Reese Evans
 Henry N. Solbert
 Messengers:
 William H. Barnes
 William Benedict
 William Bennett
 H. M. Bingham
 Charles L. Catlin
 Edwin C. Mason
 William E. Miller
 James H. Neavill
 George D. Potter
 William H. Smith

References

External links

1861 in Wisconsin
Wisconsin
Wisconsin legislative sessions